= Fairway Acres, Virginia =

Unincorporated community in Virginia, US

Coordinates: 37°32′46″N 77°31′06″W

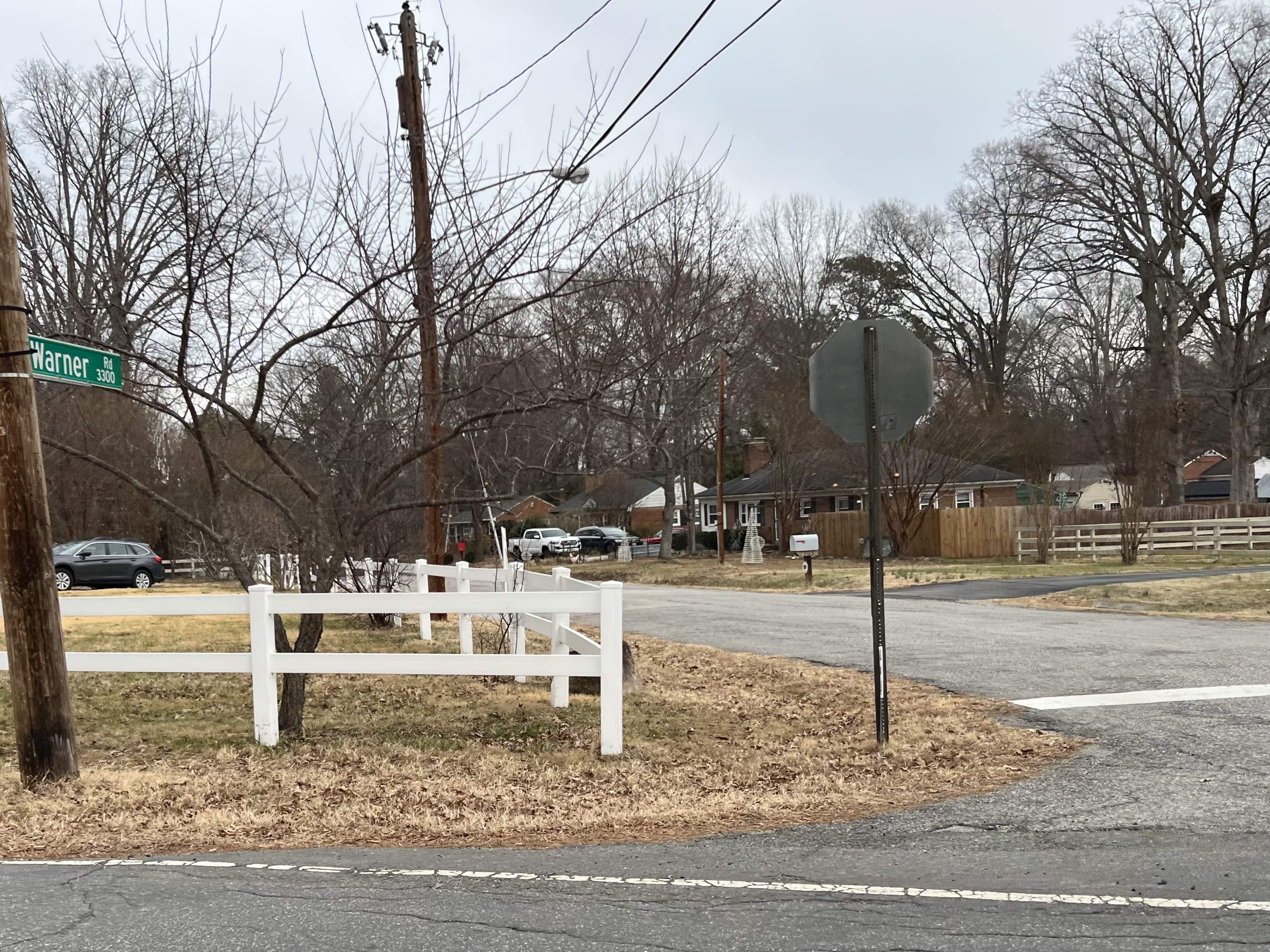
Fairway Acres

Fairway Acres is an unincorporated community in the City of Richmond in the U.S. state of Virginia.
